Bogorodskoye is a rural locality (a village) and the administrative centre of Denisovsky Selsoviet, Meleuzovsky District, Bashkortostan, Russia. The population was 508 as of 2010. There are 6 streets.

Geography 
Bogorodskoye is located 26 km northwest of Meleuz (the district's administrative centre) by road. Mikhaylovka is the nearest rural locality.

References 

Rural localities in Meleuzovsky District